Foxhow is a locality in Victoria, Australia, located 200 km south-west of Melbourne in an agricultural area at the northern end of Lake Corangamite.

Foxhow Post Office opened around 1902 and closed in 1959 although an earlier office had a brief existence around 1870.

References

Towns in Victoria (Australia)
Shire of Corangamite